Maathai Supermarkets, often referred to simply as Maathai, is supermarket chain in Kenya.

Location

Overview
The supermarket chain owns and operates supermarkets in Kenya, the largest economy in the East African Community. Maathai is one of the big four supermarket chains in Kenya, behind  Naivas,  Quickmart and Magunas.

Branches
 the supermarket chain maintains a total of seven branches in the following locations:

Ownership
Maathai is a wholly Kenyan, privately held company. Kenyan print media indicate that the supermarket chain is owned by Viktah Maina, a Thika-based businessman.

Recent developments
In September 2014, the retail chain opened its first store in the central business district (CBD) of Nairobi, Kenya's capital and largest city. Located along Ronald Ngala Street, the store employs 70 staff. It is located in a building owned by Viktah Maina, the proprietor of the supermarket chain. He also has investments in construction, entertainment, real estate and stone quarries. He is reported to be looking for expansion space in Nairobi's CBD.

See also

References

External links
The Most Popular Supermarkets In Nairobi, Kenya

Supermarkets of Kenya
Thika